Notomulciber basimaculatus is a species of beetle in the family Cerambycidae. It was described by Stephan von Breuning and de Jong in 1941. It is known from Sumatra.

References

Homonoeini
Beetles described in 1941